The tawny-bellied seedeater (Sporophila hypoxantha) is a bird species in the family Thraupidae (formerly in Emberizidae). It is found in Argentina, Bolivia, Brazil, Paraguay, and Uruguay. Its natural habitats are dry savanna and subtropical or tropical seasonally wet or flooded lowland grassland.

References

tawny-bellied seedeater
Birds of Bolivia
Birds of the Pantanal
Birds of Paraguay
Birds of Brazil
Birds of Argentina
tawny-bellied seedeater
Taxonomy articles created by Polbot